Colonial Park Mall is a shopping mall in Lower Paxton Township, Pennsylvania, about  NE of Harrisburg. Located at the northeast corner of U.S. Route 22 and Colonial Road in the Colonial Park CDP just east of Interstate 83 and south of Interstate 81, it serves the eastern and northern suburbs of the Harrisburg metropolitan area.  The mall's anchor store is Boscov's. There are 2 vacant anchor stores that were once The Bon-Ton and Sears.

History
The mall originally opened in 1960 as an open-air center called Colonial Park Plaza and featured Sears and Food Fair as anchor stores. It was enclosed and renamed Colonial Park Mall in 1970. Three years later, Pomeroy's was added to the mall.  In 1987, Boscov's was added.  That same year, The Bon-Ton company acquired the Pomeroy's chain from Allied Department Stores and rebranded the stores as The Bon-Ton in 1990.  

In 1997, Glimcher Realty Trust acquired the Colonial Park Mall from Catalina Partners LP. Washington Prime Group assumed ownership of the mall in 2014 when it acquired Glimcher Realty Trust. In 2017, Kohan Retail Investment Group bought the Colonial Park Mall from Washington Prime Group for $15 million.

The Bon-Ton store closed in 2018.

In September 2021, it was announced that the Sears anchor store, which was among the chain's last less than forty stores, would close. It closed on November 14, 2021.

Anchors

Current
Boscov's - since 1987

Former
The Bon-Ton - 1990-2018
Sears - 1960-November 2021
Pomeroy's - 1973-1990
Food Fair

Reference list

External links
 Colonial Park Mall

Shopping malls in Harrisburg, Pennsylvania
Shopping malls established in 1960
Kohan Retail Investment Group